The 2014 Scottish League Cup final was the 68th final of the Scottish League Cup. The final took place on 16 March 2014 at Celtic Park, Glasgow. The clubs contesting the 2014 final were Scottish Premiership clubs, Aberdeen and Inverness CT.  This was the first major final for Inverness CT.

Aberdeen won the final 4–2 against Inverness CT on penalties. It was their first trophy since the 1995 Scottish League Cup victory.

Route to the final

Aberdeen were one of the seven Scottish Premiership sides who entered the League Cup in the second round. Inverness CT entered in the third round.

Aberdeen

In the second round Aberdeen faced a home tie against Scottish Championship team Alloa Athletic. The Dons edged through by winning 6–5 on penalties.

In the next round Aberdeen faced Scottish Championship team Falkirk at the Falkirk Stadium. A hat-trick from Scott Vernon and goals from Joe Shaughnessy and Cammy Smith sealed Aberdeen's passage into the quarter-final.

Aberdeen drew Scottish Premiership opposition in the quarter-finals in the shape of Motherwell. Late goals from Andrew Considine and Jonny Hayes sent the Dons into the semi-finals.

Aberdeen beat St Johnstone in the semi-final with a magnificent display. Jonny Hayes grabbed a double and Peter Pawlett and Adam Rooney also got themselves on the scoresheet to send Aberdeen to their first League Cup final since 2000.

Inverness CT

In the third round Inverness CT faced an away tie against Scottish Championship team Dundee. An early goal from Billy McKay saw the Caley Jags through comfortably. In the next round Inverness CT faced fellow Scottish Premiership team Dundee United at the Caledonian Stadium. Keith Watson opened the scoring for Dundee United before Gary Warren equalised for the home side. Ross Draper sealed Caley's passage into the semi-finals with a header in the final minute of extra time.

Inverness CT beat Hearts on penalties in the semi-final. Greg Tansey put the Highlanders ahead shortly after half time, but a double from Jamie Hamill swung the game in the favour of the Edinburgh side. Nick Ross scored a dramatic injury time equaliser despite Caley having Gary Warren and Josh Meekings sent off.

Build-Up

Aberdeen received and sold all of their 43,000 allocation for the final and also had a request for more tickets declined due to safety concerns. Inverness sold 7,000 tickets.

Details

References

External links
Official Site 

2014
2
League Cup Final
Aberdeen F.C. matches
Inverness Caledonian Thistle F.C. matches
Association football penalty shoot-outs
2010s in Glasgow
March 2014 sports events in the United Kingdom
Sports competitions in Glasgow